This is a list of bestselling novels in the United States in the 1970s, as determined by Publishers Weekly. The list features the most popular novels of each year from 1970 through 1975.

The standards set for inclusion in the lists – which, for example, led to the exclusion of the novels in the Harry Potter series from the lists for the 1990s and 2000s – are currently unknown.

1970
 Love Story by Erich Segal
 The French Lieutenant's Woman by John Fowles
 Islands in the Stream by Ernest Hemingway
 The Crystal Cave by Mary Stewart
 Great Lion of God by Taylor Caldwell
 QB VII by Leon Uris
 The Gang That Couldn't Shoot Straight by Jimmy Breslin
 The Secret Woman by Victoria Holt
 Travels with My Aunt by Graham Greene
 Rich Man, Poor Man by Irwin Shaw

1971
 Wheels by Arthur Hailey
 The Exorcist by William P. Blatty
 The Passions of the Mind by Irving Stone
 The Day of the Jackal by Frederick Forsyth
 The Betsy by Harold Robbins
 Message from Malaga by Helen MacInnes
 The Winds of War by Herman Wouk
 The Drifters by James A. Michener
 The Other by Tom Tryon
 Rabbit Redux by John Updike

1972
 Jonathan Livingston Seagull by Richard Bach
 August 1914 by Aleksandr Solzhenitsyn
 The Odessa File by Frederick Forsyth
 The Day of the Jackal by Frederick Forsyth
 The Word by Irving Wallace
 The Winds of War by Herman Wouk
 Captains and the Kings by Taylor Caldwell
 Two from Galilee by Marjorie Holmes
 My Name is Asher Lev by Chaim Potok
 Semi-Tough by Dan Jenkins

1973
 Jonathan Livingston Seagull by Richard Bach
 Once Is Not Enough by Jacqueline Susann
 Breakfast of Champions by Kurt Vonnegut
 The Odessa File by Frederick Forsyth
 Burr by Gore Vidal
 The Hollow Hills by Mary Stewart
 Evening in Byzantium by Irwin Shaw
 The Matlock Paper by Robert Ludlum
 The Billion Dollar Sure Thing by Paul E. Erdman
 The Honorary Consul by Graham Greene

1974
 Centennial by James A. Michener
 Watership Down by Richard Adams
 Jaws by Peter Benchley
 Tinker, Tailor, Soldier, Spy by John le Carré
 Something Happened by Joseph Heller
 The Dogs of War by Frederick Forsyth
 The Pirate by Harold Robbins
 I Heard the Owl Call My Name by Margaret Craven
 The Seven-Per-Cent Solution by Nicholas Meyer
 The Fan Club by Irving Wallace

1975
 Ragtime by E. L. Doctorow
 The Moneychangers by Arthur Hailey
 Curtain by Agatha Christie
 Looking for Mr. Goodbar by Judith Rossner
 The Choirboys by Joseph Wambaugh
 The Eagle Has Landed by Jack Higgins
 The Greek Treasure by Irving Stone
 The Great Train Robbery by Michael Crichton
 Shōgun by James Clavell
 Humboldt's Gift by Saul Bellow

1976
 Trinity by Leon Uris
 Sleeping Murder by Agatha Christie
 Dolores by Jacqueline Susann
 Storm Warning by Jack Higgins
 The Deep by Peter Benchley
 1876 by Gore Vidal
 Slapstick or Lonesome No More! by Kurt Vonnegut
 The Lonely Lady by Harold Robbins
 Touch Not the Cat by Mary Stewart
 A Stranger in the Mirror by Sidney Sheldon

1977
 The Silmarillion by J. R. R. Tolkien and Christopher Tolkien
 The Thorn Birds by Colleen McCullough
 Illusions: The Adventures of a Reluctant Messiah by Richard Bach
 The Honourable Schoolboy by John le Carré
 Oliver's Story by Erich Segal
 Dreams Die First by Harold Robbins
 Beggarman, Thief by Irwin Shaw
 How to Save Your Own Life by Erica Jong
 Delta of Venus by Anaïs Nin
 Daniel Martin by John Fowles

1978
 Chesapeake by James A. Michener
 War and Remembrance by Herman Wouk
 Fools Die by Mario Puzo
 Bloodline by Sidney Sheldon
 Scruples by Judith Krantz
 Evergreen by Belva Plain
 Illusions: The Adventures of a Reluctant Messiah by Richard Bach
 The Holcroft Covenant by Robert Ludlum
 Second Generation by Howard Fast
 Eye of the Needle by Ken Follett

1979
 The Matarese Circle by Robert Ludlum
 Sophie's Choice by William Styron
 Overload by Arthur Hailey
 Memories of Another Day by Harold Robbins
 Jailbird by Kurt Vonnegut
 The Dead Zone by Stephen King
 The Last Enchantment by Mary Stewart
 The Establishment by Howard Fast
 The Third World War: August 1985 by John Hackett
 Smiley's People by John le Carré

References

Publishers Weekly bestselling novels series
Novels in the United States, bestselling
1970s in the United States